Tomasz Kapłan  (born 14 January 1984) is a Polish professional pool player. He won the 2011 European Pool Championships in the discipline of Straight pool. He has played on the Euro Tour since 2009, reaching the semi-finals on three occasions, most recently at the 2018 Treviso Open.

Titles
 European Pool Championship
 Straight Pool (2011)
 Polish Pool Championship
Nine-Ball (2001, 2003)
Eight-Ball (2003, 2004, 2005, 2007, 2008, 2014)
Straight Pool (2005, 2007, 2008, 2009, 2010, 2012)
Ten-ball (2011)

References

External links 

 Tomasz Kapłan at kozoom.com
 Tomasz Kapłan at the European Pocket Billiard Federation

1984 births
People from Kielce
Sportspeople from Warsaw
Polish pool players
Living people
20th-century Polish people
21st-century Polish people